Stiphidiidae, also called sheetweb spiders, is a family of 	araneomorph spiders first described in 1917. All members of this family occur in New Zealand and Australia except for Asmea. They build a horizontal sheet-like web under rocks, hence the name "sheetweb spiders".

It can also be found in gardens and males may enter human homes.

Genera

, the World Spider Catalog accepts the following genera:

Aorangia Forster & Wilton, 1973 — New Zealand
Asmea Gray & Smith, 2008 — Papua New Guinea
Borrala Gray & Smith, 2004 — Australia
Carbinea Davies, 1999 — Australia
Couranga Gray & Smith, 2008 — Australia
Elleguna Gray & Smith, 2008 — Australia
Jamberoo Gray & Smith, 2008 — Australia
Kababina Davies, 1995 — Australia
Karriella Gray & Smith, 2008 — Australia
Malarina Davies & Lambkin, 2000 — Australia
Marplesia Lehtinen, 1967 — New Zealand
Neolana Forster & Wilton, 1973 — New Zealand
Neoramia Forster & Wilton, 1973 — New Zealand
Pillara Gray & Smith, 2004 — Australia
Procambridgea Forster & Wilton, 1973 — Australia, New Zealand
Stiphidion Simon, 1902 — Australia, New Zealand
Tartarus Gray, 1973 — Australia
Therlinya Gray & Smith, 2002 — Australia
Tjurunga Lehtinen, 1967 — Australia
Wabua Davies, 2000 — Australia

See also
 List of Stiphidiidae species

References

External links

 Picture of Cambridgea foliata
 Pictures of Stiphidium facetum and its web
 Gray, M. R. & H. M. Smith (2002). Therlinya, a new genus of spiders from eastern Australia (Araneae: Amaurobioidea). Rec. austral. Mus. 54: 293–312.PDF

 
Araneomorphae families